Xexocom, sometimes erroneously spelled Xexecom, is a hamlet in the municipality of Nebaj, in the Quiché Department of Guatemala. It is located just below the Guatemalan Altiplano and has roughly 25 households. The hamlet has a school house.

References

Populated places in the Quiché Department